Morgan Township is one of the twenty-two townships of Knox County, Ohio, United States.  The 2010 census found 1,085 people in the township, 1,069 of whom lived in the unincorporated portions of the township.

Geography
Located in the southern part of the county, it borders the following townships:
Pleasant Township - north
Harrison Township - northeast corner
Clay Township - east
Washington Township, Licking County - south
Burlington Township, Licking County - southwest
Miller Township - west

Part of the village of Utica is located in southern Morgan Township.

Name and history
Morgan Township was organized in 1808. It is named for Daniel Morgan.

It is one of six Morgan Townships statewide.

Government
The township is governed by a three-member board of trustees, who are elected in November of odd-numbered years to a four-year term beginning on the following January 1. Two are elected in the year after the presidential election and one is elected in the year before it. There is also an elected township fiscal officer, who serves a four-year term beginning on April 1 of the year after the election, which is held in November of the year before the presidential election. Vacancies in the fiscal officership or on the board of trustees are filled by the remaining trustees.

References

External links
County website

Townships in Knox County, Ohio
Townships in Ohio